Minishty (Miñeşte) is a rural locality (a selo) in Mayadykovsky Selsoviet, Dyurtyulinsky District, Bashkortostan, Russia. The population was 561 as of 2010. There are 12 streets.

Geography 
Minishty is located 33 km northeast of Dyurtyuli (the district's administrative centre) by road. Bargyzbash is the nearest rural locality.

References 

Rural localities in Dyurtyulinsky District